Shashank Subramanyam (born 14 October 1978) is a flutist from India and specializes in Indian classical music. The Govt. of France awarded the prestigious Knighthood / title of Chevalier de l'Ordre des Arts et des Lettres. He is also the youngest recipient of the Sangeet Natak Akademi's senior award by Govt. of India bestowed by the Hon. President of India for the year 2017 at an investiture ceremony held at Rashtrapathi Bhavan in New Delhi. 

He was a child prodigy and began performing from his age of 6 in 1984 and has performed  for over three decades.

Early life
Shashank Subramanyam was born in Rudrapatna, India to Hemalatha and Subramanyam. His forefathers belong to Tirunelveli dist of Tamil Nadu. He was trained in Carnatic music by his father, Palghat K.V. Narayanaswami, and Hindustani music under Pandit Jasraj. Shashank is married to Shirisha, a Bharatanatyam dancer. He had no Gurus for Flute playing and was self taught. Shashank and Shirisha have a daughter Swara and son Samvit and live in Chennai, India.

Performing career
Shashank performed in public for the first time in 1984 at the age of six. Shashank began performing at the top circuit in 1990 with major performances in Adelaide, Australia, Kuala Lumpur, Malaysia and in Singapore followed by his major performance at Shastri hall in December 1990. His career-defining moment came when the Music Academy invited Shashank, just 12 years old, to perform in the senior most performance slot "SADAS concert" at The Music Academy, Chennai 1 January 1991.

Shashank has worked extensively presenting collaborative performances with host of musicians from India and around the world including John McLaughlin, Paco de Lucia, Wuppertal and Shanxi Symphony Orchestras, Helsinki Baroque Orchestra, The New Jungle Orchestra, Mikkel Nordso, Terry Riley, Ustad Shahid Parvez, Zakir Hussain, Ustad Sultan Khan, Pandit Vishwa Mohan Bhatt, Ronu Mazumdar, Ustad Shujaat Khan, and Debu Choudhury. 

Shashank performs in a wide range of concert environments from the pure Indian classical, Symphonies, Jazz, Films and crossover projects. He has led many ensembles and also has been a guest artist on many famed bands like Remember Shakti, New Jungle Orchestra, Blue Lotus, etc.

The BBC World TV did a documentary on Shashank titled Destination Music in 2006 and the CNN international TV featured Shashank's performance and interview  as part of the Travel Logue India show.

Shashank has performed for many Hon. Presidents of India including R. Venkatraman, Dr. Abdul Kalam, Ms. Pratibha Patil and Ramnath Kovind at the Rashtrapathi Bhavan in New Delhi.

Awards and honours

•	Chevalier de l'Ordre des Arts et des Lettres (Knighthood) by Govt of France 2022 (to be bestowed)

•	Grammy Nomination for the CD album with Guitarist John McLaughlin for the year 2009. 

•	Sangeet Natak Akademi’s senior award of Govt of India for the year 2017 bestowed by Hon. President of India.

•	"Kalaimamani" from the Government of Tamil Nadu for the year 2001. 

•	"A Top" ranking in the All India Radio and TV.  

•	Empaneled under outstanding category of Artists in ICCR, Govt of India (1995)

•	"Kuzhal Arasar" in 2003 from the prestigious Kellogg School of Management, Chicago. 

•	"Proclamation to the city" award by Cities of Tulsa and Memphis, USA. 

•	Rotary Club awards of excellence 1995 and 1997. 

•	Asthana Vidwan of Sringeri bestowed Jagadguru Shankaracharya of Sringeri in the year 2000.

•	Direct A grade ranking at his age of 14 in 1993 in the All India Radio and TV.

Countries performed

Shashank has performed and taught in prestigious institutions in India and over 50 countries around the world including India, USA, China, Canada, Macedonia, Hungary, Bangladesh, UK, France, Holland, Belgium, Germany, Switzerland, Austria, Italy, Denmark, Norway, Portugal, Spain, South Africa, Kuwait, UAE, Qatar, Oman, Bahrain, Iran, Morocco, Indonesia, Sri Lanka, Malaysia, Singapore, Australia, New Zealand, Japan, Hong Kong, Taiwan, Philippines and Korea.

Style and Contribution

Specialized in Carnatic classical music and trained in Hindustani Classical music as well, he incorporates patterns of improvisation from both systems of Music from India and uses a range of flutes to cover octaves that are not supported by the traditional Carnatic flute. Shashank is known for his intricate (Improvisations), melodious keerthana ( composition) renderings and pulsating kalpanaswaram (Faster and rhythmic improvisations).  His concerts generally include a Ragam Tanam Pallavi as a central piece, normally composed by Shashank himself.

Several valuable contributions to the field of Flute playing including the following.

• Introduced and furthered the revolutionary Multi Flute Fingering technique in Carnatic Music performances that have inspired scores of Flute players and Musicians from India and around the world.

• Shashank style of Flute playing techniques that helped reproduce the human voice better and solved many old issues of fingering techniques.

• Claw shaped fingering technique that has eased playing fast phrases, produce echo effects among many others. Especially the work done on how best to produce faster taans effectively spanning various octaves, intricate slides between notes and octaves, gamakas, reduction of stress on fingers with invention of easier finger movements, among many others.

• Shashank has done extensive work in area of harmoniously integrating the Vocal and instrumental styles of Carnatic to a unique style of his own, especially with the sounds that the Flute produces.

• Dual Octave Sound production technique producing two octaves simultaneously, new ways using flute playing techniques to present Kalpana swaras and Tanam in Carnatic Music portraying a combination of Vocal / Instrumental styles and unique sounds produced only on the Flute.

• Advanced breath control techniques, tonguing techniques, use of percussion like fingering technique on the Flute among scores of other contributions which are difficult to explain in writing that have overall improved ways of Flute playing immensely.

• Co-creator of Shashank style of Carnatic Flute, a near perfect bamboo flute that solved age old defects that existed with the instrument.

• Shashank is believed to have introduced to the system of Carnatic Flute, the deep bass flutes (Shankh Bansuri - sounds like the conch). These have been well documented in public performances and in CDs produced between 1999 - until date. 

• Introduced specially designed long base flutes with eight holes and made it possible for it to be the primary instrument in a Carnatic Music performance. Prior to this, traditionally, only shorter flutes were used in a concert. With this, Shashank has a range of Five octaves.

Discography

He has released over 80 CDs and 10 DVDs.

 Mukunda Malini - CD 2021
 Ardhanareeshwaram - Kumudhakriya CD 2021
 Venu Vandanam Part 1 - CD 2021
 Venu Vandanam Part 2 - CD 2021
 Shashank with Wuppertal Symphony Orchestra – CD 2021
 Silent Breath by Meditation House Records, Germany 2020
 WORD'N GLOBAL - A collaborative of Middle Eastern and Indian Music - published in Denmark 2020.
 Language of Musc, by Shashank, Mike Herting, Paul Shigihara. A live concert held in Cologne, Germany – by Riverside Records 2019
 Charukeshi – 2016
 Shashank with Sai Symphony – CD 2015
 Shashank with Sai Symphony – DVD 2015
 Seven Continents – Cross over CD with Shashank and Mikkel Nordso – 2015
 Spirit of Krishna – Shashank and the Folk Musicians of Rajasthan – 2012
 Shashank, John Sund and Phalgun – Trio Indo Danish jazz CD 2011
 Gambian Nights – India African collaboration with Kora Player Dawda – 2011
 RoR Touch Part 2 – a Fusion album  – EMI / India Beat Records – 2008
 Sundara – DVD – 2010
 Mohana – DVD- 2010
 Sundara – CD – 2010
 Mohana – CD – 2010
 Live at the Playhouse – Copenhagen Jazz Festival – Jazz CD – 2009
 RoR Touch – a Fusion album  – EMI / India Beat Records – 2008
 Floating Point with Legendary Guitarist John McLaughlin
 Bindumalini
 Josh  – Live concert held at Saptak, Ahmedabad – CD 1
 Josh  – Live concert held at Saptak, Ahmedabad – CD 2
Utsav – Celebrations of Indian Classical Music – Shashank by Music Today – DVD – 2007
 Enchanting Hamsadhwani
 Utsav – Music Today Masters of Indian Music – DVD intro by Pandit Jasraj
 Raag Lathangi
 Rasayana – Flute and Sitar in a dialogue – CD 1
 Rasayana – Flute and Sitar in a dialogue – CD 2
 Margazhi Melodies – Live Concert 2004  – CD 1, CD 2
 Kalarasana – Live in Chennai – CD 1, CD 2, CD 3
 MOKSHA – Salvation
 FLIGHTS OF ECSTASY – 2005
 INTUITVE MINDS- The lute and Bamboo in a dialogue – CD 1, CD 2
 KRISHNA SMARANAM – DVD
 ANUBHAV – DVD
 KRISHNA SMARANAM – CD 1, CD 2
 PULLANKUZHAL OF SOUTH INDIA – KING RECORDS
 MUSIC ACADEMY, MADRAS – CD 1, CD 2, CD 3
 SAMMILAN – North and South in a melting pot
 MEDITATIVE SPELL
 THE BAMBOO IN A DIALOGUE
 MOONLIT MELODIES – MUSIC TODAY
 FLUTE FANTASIA – NAVRAS RECORDS
 REMINISCENCE OF BRINDAVAN
 MOMENTS OF ECSTASY – CD 1, CD 2
 God has many names – Swiss text book CD – 1995
 Endless beauties from the Bamboo – 1994 – CD 1, CD 2
 Melodies from the Bamboo Flute – CD 1 and 2 – 1993
 Melodies from the Bamboo Flutes – Album 2 – 1992
 Melodies from the Bamboo Flutes – Album 1 – 1991

References

External links

 Official site

Living people
1978 births
Indian flautists
Kannada people
People from Hassan district
Venu players
Indian male classical musicians
Musicians from Karnataka
Recipients of the Sangeet Natak Akademi Award